Danville Public Library is a library in Danville, Illinois formed in 1883 by consolidating several existing collections.  Originally it existed in rented space in buildings in downtown Danville.  On November 7, 1904, a new Carnegie library opened and served for the next 91 years. The library had a Beaux-Arts design with columns flanking the front doors and a parapet wall above the entrance. It was expanded in 1929 thanks to a gift from Augustus Webster.

Construction on a new library building just north of the existing building began in 1994 and was completed in 1995.  The grand opening was held on November 7, 1995.

The Carnegie building still exists and now operates as the Vermilion County War Museum.

Gallery

References

External links
Danville Public Library website
Vermilion County War Museum

Library buildings completed in 1904
Buildings and structures in Danville, Illinois
Public libraries in Illinois
Carnegie libraries in Illinois
National Register of Historic Places in Vermilion County, Illinois